Foulquier's grizzled skipper (Pyrgus bellieri, syn. P. foulquieri) is a species of skipper (family Hesperiidae). It has a limited distribution in central and southern France and adjacent areas of Spain and Italy and also Corsica. Within this range it can be quite common.

As with other Pyrgus species, this is very difficult to identify in the field. It is often paler than most of its congeners with a yellowish suffusion, especially in the female. The hindwings usually have pale markings forming a continuous band. The wingspan is 26–30 mm. The adults are on the wing in July and August.

The larval food plant is Potentilla.

The species name honours Gedeon Foulquier.

References

Whalley, Paul - Mitchell Beazley Guide to Butterflies (1981, reprinted 1992)

External links
Lepiforum.de
Fauna Europaea 

Pyrgus
Butterflies described in 1910
Butterflies of Europe